Thermopolyspora is a Gram-positive bacterial genus from the family of Streptosporangiaceae. It currently contains a single species.

References

Actinomycetota
Bacteria genera